The Hate-Monger is the name of several different   fictional characters appearing in American comic books published by Marvel Comics.

Publication history

The original character first appeared in Fantastic Four #21 (December, 1963) and was created by Stan Lee and Jack Kirby.

Fictional character biography

Adolf Hitler clone
The Hate-Monger first appeared in the small fictional nation of San Gusto in South America, and came to the attention of authorities when he took over with the use of storm troopers, hoping to upset the balance of power in South America. The Fantastic Four saw a hate rally in New York City and the Thing tried to wreck it, but the Fantastic Four were caught off guard by the Hate-Monger's weapon — the Hate-Ray — which instilled hate for others, causing them to fight each other. As a result, the team disbanded and went their separate ways. Nick Fury, at the time a CIA agent, then managed to trick Mister Fantastic into traveling to San Gusto with him to fight the Hate-Monger, knowing the other members would follow. The Hate-Monger saw the plane leaving and used a device that traveled underground by the use of flames that carved out tunnels to quickly get to South America. Fury and Reed fought off some of the rebels, and infiltrated the Hate-Monger's headquarters after Reed found a device sending out beams and found the source of the disturbance. However, Reed was paralyzed with nerve gas and captured by the Hate-Monger, who revealed he had been bouncing his ray off the Moon, which had been causing abnormal effects on the tides. Fury managed to cure Mister Fantastic after getting the cure for the ray and gas from the Hate-Monger at gunpoint, though the Hate-Monger stopped them from capturing him by lowering bulletproof glass. Mister Fantastic then gave the antidote to the other members, and together they got to the base to help Nick Fury. In the final confrontation, the Hate-Monger was shot and killed by some of his own stormtroopers when an H-Ray beam struck some soldiers by mistake due to the Invisible Girl. When Mr. Fantastic removed the Hate-Monger's mask, it was revealed that Hate-Monger was Adolf Hitler who apparently survived World War II, though it is claimed it may be one of his doubles.

It was discovered later that the scientist Arnim Zola had perfected a means of transferring the mind to the body of a clone, thereby allowing Hitler to live on in the event of the death of his body. The Hate-Monger suffered a succession of defeats by Nick Fury, who wrecked the Hate-Monger's attempt to blackmail the nations of Earth with the "Hate-Ray" from an orbiting space station. The Hate-Monger was killed again. The Hate-Monger returned and planned to use a spacecraft to recapture his space station from S.H.I.E.L.D. He fought the Man-Wolf, but his base was invaded by S.H.I.E.L.D. and he was killed again.

His consciousness then resided within a cloned brain mounted on an android.  Zola and the Red Skull unsuccessfully attempted to transplant the brain into the body of his old enemy, Captain America. He later battled Captain America again. The Hate-Monger eventually allied himself with his old pupil the Red Skull, and the two villains began plotting against each other when they gained possession of the Cosmic Cube, which could only be wielded by one person. The Hate-Monger decided to use his mind-transference powers to gain control of the Cube itself, rather than another clone. It was only after he had transferred his mind into the Cube that he realized that the Cube was not complete and nothing more than an empty shell. With the Hate-Monger's mind trapped within the featureless void of the incomplete Cube's matrix, he eventually went mad until fading into nothingness.

Years later, the Hate-Monger was brought back to physical reality by the Red Skull. The Hate-Monger now existed as a being of pure energy, and was able to project the H-Ray at will. Using his new abilities, the Hate-Monger caused strikes and revolts in New York City under the guise of union representative Adam Hauser. The Hate-Monger then stole a mind-amplification device from S.H.I.E.L.D., which allowed him to incite violence and destruction all over the United States. The Hate-Monger then captured his old foes Captain America, Nick Fury, and the Sub-Mariner, and boasted that they were powerless to stop him. While Fury and Namor succumbed to the H-Ray, Captain America refused to surrender to his hatred. This failure infuriated the Hate-Monger to such a degree that the mind-amplifier exploded, apparently destroying him for once and for all.

National Force Hate-Monger
A new Hate-Monger appeared wearing a version of Captain America's uniform, and is seen murdering illegal immigrants, saying "America belongs to Americans". This Hate-Monger and his organization, a new iteration of the National Force, were all wiped out by the Punisher, who wore his own version of the Captain America uniform for the occasion.

Edmund Heidler
Years later during the Heroic Age event, Steve Rogers discovered a clone of Hitler retaining absolutely no memory of his programming. This clone goes by the name of Edmund Heidler and is a painter. Steve Rogers talks to him trying to find any evidence of his original protocol, but he does not receive anything other than a few racist comments. Leaving his art sale, Steve Rogers returns to Sharon Carter who wants to flat-out kill him. She is stopped by Rogers who tells her that he has not done anything wrong. They agree to keep an eye on him. After Rogers leaves, Heidler begins to subconsciously paint swastikas in his apartment.

Josh Glenn
A new Hate-Monger named Josh Glenn eventually emerges in the midst of the Fear Itself storyline. Originally an office worker who became frustrated by what he perceived as persecution at the hands of immigrants, Glenn took it upon himself to continue the Hate-Monger's legacy after learning about the villain through various conspiracy theory websites. Glenn's paranoid anti-immigrant attitudes culminated in an attempt to steal firearms from a local pawn shop, which resulted in his capture at the hands of the Black Panther. Following Glenn's release, the essence of the original Hate-Monger somehow returned from space and entered his body, granting him the abilities of his predecessor. The new Hate-Monger then set out to enact his revenge on Black Panther, recruiting a new nationalist vigilante known as the American Panther as part of his scheme, but T'Challa was eventually able to drive the spirit out of its current host.

The Hate-Monger later uses HYDRA's time travel technology to try to alter history by assassinating Barack Obama in 1965, but is prevented from doing so by both Nick Fury and Nick Fury Jr. Glenn as Hate-Monger would join the Hellfire Club on an assault on Krakoa.

Other Hate-Mongers
 The Man-Beast once impersonated the Hate-Monger.
 Psycho-Man created an android he called the Hate-Monger until it was destroyed by the Scourge of the Underworld.
 An energy vampire who fed off hate adopted the name of the Hate-Monger for a time, then changed his name to Animus.

Powers and abilities
The Hate-Monger was an ordinary man with no superhuman powers, created as the result of cloning and genetic engineering. The Hate-Monger's brain has been "energized" by Arnim Zola's techniques, enabling him to project his consciousness into the brain of a body cloned from his own if his current body is dying. He used several such bodies, including one which possessed superhuman strength, but was mute.

The Hate-Monger wears chain-mail body armor under his hood, tunic, and boots. He has sometimes worn an armored battle-suit containing an exoskeleton that amplifies his strength to superhuman levels. Scientists and technicians in the Hate-Monger's employ, including Arnim Zola, have manufactured and supplied him with a number of other paraphernalia and contrivances. He is often armed with his handgun projecting the "Hate-ray" or "H-ray", high frequency microwave radiation that affects the centers of the human brain controlling emotions so as to stimulate and magnify the victims' feelings of dread, fear, and anger to unreasonable levels, including repressed or subconscious sentiments of this kind. The hate-ray can also transform feelings of love into equally strong or perhaps even stronger hatreds. He also had access to large-scale "Hate-ray" projectors, missiles armed with nuclear warheads, disease-carrying bacilli, and various advanced aircraft and spacecraft.

After his resurrection by the Cosmic Cube, the Hate-Monger was now a being of pure energy that could take on any form he wished, and his H-Ray powers were now his own. He was able to regenerate from most wounds and could fire laser-like beams from his eyes.

As Hitler, the Hate-Monger was also a cunning strategist and a charismatic leader, and able to incite fanatical loyalty to him through his rhetoric and persuasive personality. He is a good hand-to-hand combatant, and has apparently received some training in physical combat. He also had some talent in painting.

In other media

Video games
 A version of the Hate-Monger appeared in the second season of Marvel: Avengers Alliance.

Reception

The Hate-Monger is discussed by C. Richard King and David J. Leonard in Beyond Hate: White Power and Popular Culture.

See also
 Adolf Hitler in popular culture

References

External links
 Hate-Monger (Adolf Hitler Clone) at Marvel.com
 Hate-Monger II at Marvel.com
 
 

Articles about multiple fictional characters
Characters created by Jack Kirby
Characters created by Stan Lee
Clone characters in comics
Comics characters introduced in 1963
Cultural depictions of Adolf Hitler
Fictional artists
Fictional dictators
Fictional mass murderers
Fictional writers
Marvel Comics Nazis
Marvel Comics supervillains